Juicio Final (Spanish for Final Judgment) is the second studio album by former reggaeton artist Héctor el Father. It was released on September 23, 2008. The album features guest appearances from Cosculluela, Harry Maldonado and Lilly Goodman. The album was supported by the singles "Te Vi Llorar" and "Y Llora".

Track listing

Chart performance

References 

2008 albums
Christian music albums by Puerto Rican artists
Héctor el Father albums